The 1973 SCCA L&M Championship was the seventh annual running of the Sports Car Club of America's professional open wheel racing series. The championship, which was open to Formula 5000 cars, was won by South African driver Jody Scheckter.

Race schedule
The championship was contested over a nine race series.

Points system
Championship points were awarded on a 20-15-12-10-8-6-4-3-2-1 basis for the first ten positions in each race.

Championship standings

References

External links
Old Racing Cars Formula 5000 page

Formula 5000
SCCA Continental Championship
LandM Championship